Zinc finger protein 184, also known as ZNF184, is a protein that in humans is encoded by the ZNF184 gene on chromosome 6. It was first identified by Goldwurm et al. in 1996.

The National Center for Biotechnology Information (NCBI) Gene database entry  for ZNF184 identifies conserved domains KRAB_A  (Krüppel associated box) near the N-terminus and Zn-finger (Zinc finger) at the C-terminus of the translated protein. The former is associated with transcription repression and the latter with DNA binding (see Zinc finger).

Domains and Structure

The figure below is a reformatted and annotated conceptual translation display of ZNF184s Consensus CDS.  CCDS displays exons in alternating black and blue font, with red indicating a residue coded across a splice boundary.

ZNF184 has 19 zinc finger motifs at the end of its final and longest exon.  The figure shows regularity among the fingers in this protein, including the 2 columns of green-highlighted Cysteine residues and the 2 columns of blue-highlighted His residues which are the reason this type of zinc finger is called C2H2'''.  Light grey highlighted columns (one with all F; one with mostly L, and F substitutions) are highly conserved hydrophobic'' residues within the zinc finger motif.  The other light grey highlighted column (mostly K, with a similar R substitution) is an example of fairly strong conservation in the coil sections connecting adjacent fingers.

Near the N-terminus is a KRAB_A domain followed by a KRAB_B domain.  KRAB_A has a shorter α-Helix followed by a longer α-Helix.  The KRAB_A motif in a zinc finger protein is known to bind with a KAP-1 protein (aka TRIM28) to accomplish a transcription repressor function, however a gene so regulated by ZNF184 has yet to be identified.  The length-11 finger helices are indicated, as well as the overlapping 7-residue section in each finger which binds targeted DNA (if the finger is functioning).

References

Further reading